Michael Jamont'e Tyson (born July 27, 1993) is an American football safety who is a free agent. He was drafted by the Seattle Seahawks in the sixth round, 187th overall of the 2017 NFL Draft. He played college football at Cincinnati.

Early years
Tyson attended Lake Taylor High School in Norfolk, Virginia before attending Hargrave Military Academy for his senior year.

Tyson was rated as a four-star recruit by Scout.com and a three-star recruit from Rivals.com. He was recruited by Robert Prunty, defensive coordinator at the University of Cincinnati at the time, and committed to play college football at Cincinnati.

College career
At the University of Cincinnati, Tyson played in 43 games at the safety position, playing since his first year. Tyson recorded seven interceptions in college, five of which came his senior season, the only season he started. He also logged 137 career tackles and a fumble recovery.

Professional career

Seattle Seahawks
Tyson was drafted by the Seattle Seahawks in the sixth round, 187th overall, in the 2017 NFL Draft. On May 17, 2017, Tyson signed a four-year deal worth $2.5 million overall with a $172,000 signing bonus.

Tyson entered the NFL draft as a safety, the position he played at Cincinnati, though shortly after being drafted by the Seahawks, general manager John Schneider announced that Tyson would transition to cornerback. He was waived on September 2, 2017, and was signed to the Seahawks' practice squad the next day. He was promoted to the active roster on December 16, 2017, but did not play in his rookie season.

On September 1, 2018, Tyson was waived by the Seahawks.

Houston Texans
On September 3, 2018, Tyson was signed to the Houston Texans' practice squad. He was promoted to the active roster on October 9, 2018. He was placed on injured reserve on January 2, 2019. He was waived on May 10, 2019.

Green Bay Packers
On May 13, 2019, Tyson was claimed off waivers by the Green Bay Packers. He was waived/injured on August 26, 2019 and placed on injured reserve. He was waived from injured reserve on September 2, 2019.

Toronto Argonauts
On January 13, 2021, Tyson signed with the Toronto Argonauts of the Canadian Football League (CFL). He was released on June 14, 2021.

References

External links
Toronto Argonauts bio
Cincinnati Bearcats bio

1993 births
Living people
American football cornerbacks
American football safeties
Cincinnati Bearcats football players
Green Bay Packers players
Houston Texans players
Players of American football from Norfolk, Virginia
Seattle Seahawks players
Toronto Argonauts players
Hargrave Military Academy alumni